Vigneux-sur-Seine (literally Vigneux on Seine) is a commune in the southern suburbs of Paris, France.

Inhabitants of Vigneux-sur-Seine are known as Vigneusiens.

Population

Transport
Vigneux-sur-Seine is served by Vigneux-sur-Seine station on Paris RER line D.

Twin towns – sister cities

Vigneux-sur-Seine is twinned with:
 Limavady, Northern Ireland, United Kingdom
 Monção, Portugal
 Troyan, Bulgaria

See also
Communes of the Essonne department

References

External links

Official website 

Mayors of Essonne Association 

Communes of Essonne